Jassem Salem (Arabic :جاسم سالم) (born 27 February 1997) is an Emirati footballer. He currently plays as a midfielder.

References

External links
 

Emirati footballers
1997 births
Living people
Al Shabab Al Arabi Club Dubai players
Shabab Al-Ahli Club players
Hatta Club players
UAE First Division League players
UAE Pro League players
Association football midfielders